Their First Mistake is a 1932 American pre-Code comedy short starring Laurel and Hardy. Directed by George Marshall, the film was produced by Hal Roach and distributed by Metro-Goldwyn-Mayer.

Plot
Mrs. Hardy is annoyed that her husband Oliver seems to spend more time with his friend Stanley than with her. After a furious argument, Mrs. Hardy says that she will leave him if Ollie goes out with Stan again. Stan suggests that Ollie adopts a baby, which he does. Unfortunately, his wife has left their apartment on returning, and a process server delivers a paper informing Ollie that she is suing him for divorce, naming Stan as co-respondent. The boys are now left to look after the infant on their own.

Cast 
 Stan Laurel
 Oliver Hardy
 Mae Busch
 Billy Gilbert
 George Marshall

Production
Their First Mistake is a rare film for the duo, as there is no resolution at the end. In the original script, Mrs. Hardy came back to Oliver with adopted baby twins, but so much time and money had been spent on adding Laurel's improvisations that there was no budget left to film it.

Note
The neighbor in the hall to whom Laurel and Hardy give the cigar is director George Marshall.

References

External links
 
 
 
 

1932 films
1932 comedy films
American black-and-white films
Films directed by George Marshall
Laurel and Hardy (film series)
Films with screenplays by H. M. Walker
1932 short films
American comedy short films
1930s English-language films
1930s American films